Sandy Ridge may refer to: 
Sandy Ridge, Hong Kong
Sandy Ridge, New Jersey
Sandy Ridge (Virginia) in the United States
The Sandy Ridge Tunnel on the CSX Kingsport Subdivision
Sandy Ridge, North Carolina